The 2019–20 National League 2 North was the eleventh season (33rd overall) of the fourth tier (north) of the English domestic rugby union competitions since the professionalised format of the second division was introduced.

On 22 February Scunthorpe were the first side to be relegated after suffering a massive 109–12 defeat against Chester, going down with eight games still to play.  Although it was a miserable season on the pitch for Scunthorpe, comfortably the weakest side in the division in terms of results, the loss of their player James Walker, who died earlier in the season was a far keener felt blow.  On 7 March Caldy became champions with a resounding 49–5 win away to relegation threatened Preston Grasshoppers to seal an instant return to National League 1 and claim their second National League 2 North title.

Due to the COVID-19 pandemic in the United Kingdom, the Rugby Football Union officially cancelled the season on 20 March 2020, after an initial postponement of all rugby in England including training.  After the cancellation was announced the RFU used a best playing record formula to decide the final table.  With Caldy already promoted, Fylde claimed the runners up spot but missed out on promotion as the 2019–20 National League 2 South runner up, Tonbridge Juddian had a better comparative league record and went up instead (the playoff had been cancelled).  Joining Scunthorpe in the relegation spots were Preston Grasshoppers and Otley.  Although Preston were as good as down by the time the leagues were suspended, Otley were in a real battle against Luctonians, and will feel hard done by.  Scunthorpe will drop to Midlands Premier while Otley and Preston Grasshoppers will drop to North Premier.  For Otley, once a second tier club, the drop to the regional leagues will be the lowest level they have played at since the 1990s.

The league was an interesting one in terms of National League 2 North records, included records that might have been achieved had the full 30 games been played.  For instance, Caldy, with 25 wins out of 25 were looking to break the record of 28 wins (out of 30) set by Hull Ionians in the 2012–13 season.  They may also have shattered the 134 point record set by Ionians during the 2014–15 season with a maximum of 144 achievable.  A club record that were achieved despite the premature ending were the 4 draws achieved by Huddersfield (breaking the record of 3 set by numerous teams), while Caldys Gavin Roberts, in finishing as league top scorer for the second time in his career, tied a record set by a number of other players such as the prolific Chris Johnson.  Stourbridge's Dan Rundle, finishing as top try scorer with 30 tries would likely have beating the existing record of 32 tries in a season (set several times by Nick Royle).  

While Caldy had been looking to break records, Scunthorpe were looking to avoid making any of their own.  Although the early end of the season meant they wouldn't equal the 30 games lost by Manchester and Dudley Kingswinford in the 2010–11 and 2013–14 seasons respectively, the club's relegation was their third from the division - equalling Morley and Sheffield.  A final record that was set was the league average league attendance which reached an all time divisional high of 348, helped by good regular attendances at the likes of Fylde, Hinckley and Wharfedale.  This was the first time in recent seasons that the National League North average attendances trumped those in National League South.

Structure
The league consists of sixteen teams with all the teams playing each other on a home and away basis to make a total of thirty matches each. There is one automatic promotion place, one play-off place and three relegation places. The champions are promoted to the 2020–21 National League 1 and the runners up play the second-placed team in the 2019–20 National League 2 South with the winner also being promoted.  The last three teams are relegated to either North Premier or Midlands Premier depending on the geographical location of the team (in some cases teams may join the southern regional leagues).

The results of the matches contribute points to the league as follows:
 4 points are awarded for a win
 2 points are awarded for a draw
 0 points are awarded for a loss, however
 1 losing (bonus) point is awarded to a team that loses a match by 7 points or fewer
 1 additional (bonus) point is awarded to a team scoring 4 tries or more in a match.

Participating teams and locations
Eleven of the teams listed below participated in the 2018–19 National League 2 North season.  The 2018–19 champions, Hull Ionians, were promoted into the 2019–20 National League 1, replacing Caldy and Loughborough Students who were relegated from the 2018–19 National League 1.  The three teams relegated from National League 2 North the previous season were Peterborough Lions and South Leicester (both Midlands Premier) and Macclesfield (North Premier).

The promoted teams include Scunthorpe (champions) and Luctonians (play-offs) from Midlands Premier, while Hull come up as champions of North Premier.  In order to address an imbalance of teams, Leicester Lions have been level transferred to the 2019–20 National League 2 South as the most appropriate located team in terms of access to the southern sides.

Tables

At the date the leagues were suspended, the National League 2 North table read as follows:

On 4 April, the Rugby Football Union confirmed the final table for the season.

Fixtures & Results

Round 1

Round 2

Round 3

Round 4

Round 5

Round 6

Round 7

Round 8

Postponed due to adverse weather conditions (wind/rain).  Game to be rescheduled for 22 February 2020.

Round 9 

Postponed out of respect for James Walker - a Scunthorpe 1st XV player - who died on the morning before the game. Game to be rescheduled for 22 February 2020.

Round 10

Round 11

Round 12

Round 13

Round 14

Round 15

Round 16

Round 17

Round 18

Round 19

Round 20

Round 21

Round 22

Round 23 

Postponed.  Game to be rescheduled for 22 February 2020.

Postponed.  Game to be rescheduled for 22 February 2020.

Postponed.  Game to be rescheduled for 14 March 2020.

Postponed.  Game to be rescheduled for 14 March 2020.

Postponed.  Game to be rescheduled for 22 February 2020.

Rounds 8, 9 & 23 (rescheduled games) 

Game originally rescheduled from 15 February 2020 but postponed again due to bad weather.  Game to be rescheduled for 14 March 2020.

Game originally rescheduled from 15 February 2020 but postponed again due to bad weather.  Game to be rescheduled for 14 March 2020.

Game rescheduled from 26 October 2019.

Game rescheduled from 2 November 2019.  Scunthorpe are relegated.

Game originally rescheduled from 15 February 2020 but postponed again due to bad weather.  Game to be rescheduled for 14 March 2020.

Round 24 

Postponed due to bad weather.  Game to be rescheduled for 11 April 2020.

Round 25 

Caldy are champions.

Round 23 (rescheduled games) 

Game originally rescheduled from 15 February 2020 and then again from 22 February 2020.

Game rescheduled from 15 February 2020. 

Game rescheduled from 15 February 2020. 

Game originally rescheduled from 15 February 2020 and then again from 22 February 2020.

Game originally rescheduled from 15 February 2020 and then again from 22 February 2020.

Round 26

Round 27

Round 28

Round 24 (rescheduled game)

Game rescheduled from 29 February 2020.

Round 29

Round 30

Attendances
 Does not include promotion play-off.

Individual statistics
 Note that points scorers includes tries as well as conversions, penalties and drop goals. Appearance figures also include coming on as substitutes (unused substitutes not included).

Top points scorers

Top try scorers

Season records

Team
Largest home win — 103 points
103 – 0 Caldy at home to Scunthorpe on 29 February 2020
Largest away win — 61 points (2)
68 – 7 Caldy away to Scunthorpe on 9 November 2019
76 – 15 Stourbridge away to Scunthorpe on 1 February 2020
Most points scored — 109 points
109 – 12 Chester at home to Scunthorpe on 22 February 2020
Most tries in a match — 17 (2)
Chester at home to Scunthorpe on 22 February 2020
Caldy at home to Scunthorpe on 29 February 2020
Most conversions in a match — 12
Chester at home to Scunthorpe on 22 February 2020
Most penalties in a match — 6
Sheffield Tigers away to Otley on 7 March 2020
Most drop goals in a match — 1 (2)
Sedgley Park away to Hull on 16 November 2019
Sedgley Park at home to Stourbridge on 18 January 2020

Attendances
Highest — 1,059
Fylde at home to Preston Grasshoppers on 14 September 2019
Lowest — 110 (3)
Scunthorpe at home to Luctonians on 23 November 2019
Scunthorpe at home to Loughborough Students on 7 March 2020
Scunthorpe at home to Chester on 14 March 2020
Highest average attendance — 679		
Fylde
Lowest average attendance — 186
Hull

Player
Most points in a match — 38
 Ben Jones for Caldy away to Scunthorpe on 9 November 2019
Most tries in a match — 4 (3)
 Nick Royle for Caldy at home to Luctonians on 5 October 2019
 Ben Jones for Caldy away to Scunthorpe on 9 November 2019
 Nick Royle for Caldy at home to Scunthorpe on 29 February 2020
Most conversions in a match — 12
 Dan Pemberton for Chester at home to Scunthorpe on 23 February 2020
Most penalties in a match — 6
 Mark Ireland for Sheffield Tigers away to Otley on 7 March 2020
Most drop goals in a match — 1 (2)
 Callum McShane for Sedgley Park away to Hull on 16 November 2019
 Stephen Collins for Sedgley Park at home to Stourbridge on 18 January 2020

Notes

See also
 2019–20 National League 2 South
 2019–20 National League 1
 English rugby union system
 Rugby union in England

References

External links
 NCA Rugby

2019–20
4N
National League 2 North